Friendship Bridge is a bridge spanning the Narva River. It links the city of Narva in Estonia with the town of Ivangorod in Russia. The Narva Friendship Bridge is part of the European route E20. The length of the bridge is 162 m.

The bridge was finished in October 1960.

References

Bridges in Estonia
Estonia–Russia border crossings
Buildings and structures in Narva
Transport in Narva
International bridges
Bridges completed in 1960